Northway Mall is the name of multiple shopping malls in the United States:

 Northway Mall (Anchorage, Alaska)
 Northway Mall (Colonie, NY), former name of Northway Shopping Center
 Northway Mall (Ross Township, PA) the former name of The Block Northway
 Northway Mall (Marshfield, WI), former name of Shoppes at Woodridge